Rolf Loer (born Lawrence F. Koehler; 19 January 1892 – 12 October 1964) was an American film actor of the silent era whose career was most prominent in German cinema. He played the character of Phantomas in a series of films, replacing Erich Kaiser-Titz who had previously played the role. Loer was also a violinist who, later in his career, performed with the Minneapolis Symphony Orchestra.

Origins
He was born January 19, 1892, in Minneapolis, Minnesota as Lawrence F. Koehler to German immigrant parents Friedrich Ernst Georg Koehler (1868-1926), a musician and conductor, and the former Magdalena Obert (1865-1957).  His brother was the composer C. Franz Koehler (1896-1980). Showing promise in the violin, his father sent him to Germany to study at the Klindworth-Scharwenka Conservatory under the guidance of Arrigio Serato in 1909.  He remained there to pursue his studies through the First World War.

Death
He returned to the United States prior to the Second World War.  He first played as violinist at the Minneapolis Symphony Orchestra, then moved to New York City, where he gave private lessons.   He died in Jackson Heights, New York on October 12, 1964.  He is buried at the Flushing Cemetery.

Selected filmography
 The Lady in the Car (1919)
 The Double Face (1920)
 The Man in the Fog (1920)
 Professor Larousse (1920)
 Destiny (1925)

References

Bibliography
 Soister, John T. Conrad Veidt on Screen: A Comprehensive Illustrated Filmography. McFarland, 2002.

External links

 Rolf Loer at Find-a-Grave 

1892 births
1964 deaths
American expatriates in Germany
American classical violinists
German classical violinists
American people of German descent
Burials at Flushing Cemetery
20th-century American male musicians